Big Wave Bay Beach is a gazetted beach next to Big Wave Bay, Shek O, Southern District, Hong Kong. The beach has barbecue pits and is managed by the Leisure and Cultural Services Department (LCSD) of the Hong Kong Government. The beach is 86 metres long and is rated as Grade 1 by the Environmental Protection Department for its water quality. This beach is popular among surfers.

Usage
The beach is accessed by Stage 8 of the Hong Kong Trail.

Features
The beach has the following features:
 BBQ pits (20 nos.)
 Changing rooms
 Showers
 Toilets
 Fast food kiosk
 Water sports centre

See also
 Beaches of Hong Kong

References

External links 

 Official website

Southern District, Hong Kong
Beaches of Hong Kong